Rehovot is a city in the Central District of Israel, about  south of Tel Aviv.

Etymology
Israel Belkind, founder of the Bilu movement, proposed the name "Rehovot" (lit. 'wide expanses') based on Genesis 26:22: "And he called the name of it Rehoboth; and he said: 'For now the Lord hath made room for us, and we shall be fruitful in the land'." This Bible verse is also inscribed in the city's logo. The biblical town of Rehoboth was located in the Negev Desert.

History

Ottoman era
Rehovot was established in 1890 by pioneers of the First Aliyah on the coastal plain near a site called Khirbat Deiran, an "abandoned or sparsely populated" estate, which now lies in the center of the built-up area of the city. According to Marom, Deiran offered "a convenient launching pad for early land purchase initiatives which shaped the pattern of Jewish settlement until the beginning of the British Mandate".

Excavations at Khirbat Deiran have revealed signs of habitation during the Hellenic, Roman and Byzantine periods, with a major expansion to about 60 dunams during the early centuries of Islamic rule. Evidence of Jewish and possibly Samaritan occupants during the Roman and Byzantine periods has been found. In 1939, Khirbet Deiran was identified by Klein as Kerem Doron ("vineyard of Doron"), a place mentioned in Talmud Yerushalmi (Peah 7:4), but Fischer believes that there is "no special reason" for this identification, while Kalmin is unsure whether Doron was a place or a person.

Rehovot was founded as a moshava in 1890 by Polish Jewish immigrants who had come with the First Aliyah, seeking to establish a township which would not be under the influence of the Baron Edmond James de Rothschild, on land which was purchased from a Christian Arab by the Menuha Venahala society, an organization in Warsaw that raised funds for Jewish settlement in Eretz Israel.

In March 1892, a dispute over pasture rights erupted between the residents of Rehovot and the neighboring village of Zarnuqa, which took two years to resolve. Another dispute broke out with the Suteriya Bedouin tribe, which had been cultivating some of the land as tenant farmers. According to Moshe Smilansky, one of the early settlers of Rehovot, the Bedouins had received compensation for the land, but refused to vacate it. In 1893, they attacked the moshava. Through the intervention of a respected Arab sheikh, a compromise was reached, with the Bedouins receiving an additional sum of money, which they used to dig a well.

In 1890, the region was an uncultivated wasteland with no trees, houses or water. The moshava's houses were initially built along two parallel streets: Yaakov Street and Benjamin Street, before later expanding, and vineyards, almond orchards and citrus groves were planted, but the inhabitants grappled with agricultural failures, plant diseases, and marketing problems.

The first citrus grove was planted by Zalman Minkov in 1904. Minkov's grove, surrounded by a wall, included a guard house, stables, a packing plant, and an irrigation system in which groundwater was pumped from a large well in the inner courtyard. The well was 23 meters deep, the height of an eight-story building, and over six meters in diameter. The water was channeled via an aqueduct to an irrigation pool, and from there to a network of ditches dug around the bases of the trees.

The Great Synagogue of Rehovot was established in 1903, during the First Aliyah period.

In 1908, the Workman's Union (Hapoel Hazair) organized a group of 300 Yemenite immigrants then living in the region of Jerusalem and Jaffa, bringing them to work as farmers in the colonies of Rishon-le-Zion and Rehovot. Only a few dozen Yemenite families had joined Rehovot by 1908. They built houses for themselves in a plot given to them at the south end of the town, which became known as Sha'araim. In 1910, Shmuel Warshawsky, with the secret support of the JNF, was sent to Yemen to recruit more agricultural laborers. Hundreds arrived starting in 1911 and were housed first in a compound one kilometre south of Rehovot and then in a large extension of the Sha'araim quarter.

In 1913, Rehovot became the flashpoint for a dramatic turn in relations between the region's ethnicities: after an itinerant Arab camel driver who was passing through stole some grapes from a local farm, local Jewish settlers who arrived on the scene brutally attacked him, which led to the arrival of Arab reinforcements, then, it led to a skirmish that proved fatal - one death on each side of the gunfire. It is alleged that this was the moment when a previously peaceful co-existence among Jews and Arabs, united under the Ottoman Empire, instantly became an "us vs. them" divisiveness that has prevailed ever since.

In February 1914, Rothschild visited Rehovot during the fourth of his five visits to the Land of Israel. That year, Rehovot had a population of around 955.

British Mandate
In 1920, the Rehovot Railway Station was opened, which greatly boosted the local citrus fruit industry. A few packing houses were built near the station so as to enable the fruit to be sent by railway to the rest of the country and to the port of Jaffa for export to Europe. According to a census conducted in 1922 by the British Mandate authorities, Rehovot had a population of 1,242 inhabitants, consisting of 1,241 Jews and 1 Muslim, increasing in 1931 census to 3,193 inhabitants, in 833 houses.
In 1924, the British Army contracted the Palestine Electric Company for wired electric power. The contract allowed the Electric Company to extend the grid beyond the original geographical limits that had been projected by the concession it was given. The high-tension line that exceeded the limits of the original concession ran along some major towns and agricultural settlements, offering extended connections to the Jewish towns of Rishon Le-Zion, Ness Ziona and Rehovot (in spite of their proximity to the high-tension line, the Arab towns of Ramleh and Lydda remained unconnected).

In 1931, the first workers moshav, Kfar Marmorek, was built on lands which were acquired from the village of Zarnuqa by the Jewish National Fund in 1926, and ten Yemenite Jewish families which were evicted from Kinneret were resettled on the land in 1931, and later, they were joined by thirty-five other families from Sha'araim. Today, it is a suburb of Rehovot.

The agricultural research station that opened in Rehovot in 1932 became the Department of Agriculture of the Hebrew University of Jerusalem. In 1933, a juice factory was built. In 1934, Chaim Weizmann established the Sieff Institute, which later became the Weizmann Institute of Science. In 1937, Weizmann built his home on the land purchased adjacent to the Sieff Institute. The house later served as the presidential residence after Weizmann became president in 1948. Weizmann and his wife are buried on the grounds of the institute.

In 1945, Rehovot had a population of 10,020, and in 1948, it had grown to 12,500. The suburb of Rehovot, Kefar Marmorek, had a population of 500 Jews in 1948.

State of Israel

On 29 February 1948, the Lehi blew up the Cairo to Haifa train shortly after it left Rehovot, killing 29 British soldiers and injuring 35. Lehi said the bombing was in retaliation for the Ben Yehuda Street bombing a week earlier. On 28 March 1948, Arabs attacked a Jewish convoy near Rehovot. In 1950, Rehovot, which had a population of about 18,000, was declared a city.

In the immediate years following the establishment of Israel, the Zarnuqa ma'abara (now named Kiryat Moshe) was established on the Southern side of Rehovot to house Jewish refugees from Eastern Europe and Arab lands. On the Southwest, the neighborhood of Kfar Gevirol (now named Ibn Gevirol, named after Solomon ibn Gabirol, 11th Century Sephardi Jewish Philosopher) was founded on lands of the depopulated Palestinian village of Al-Qubayba. Over the years, Kiryat Moshe expanded over the lands of the depopulated Palestinian village of Zarnuqa. The mosque of the village, while abandoned, still stands. On the Southeast the neighborhood of Ramat Aharon were established. The city has since then expanded in all directions, geographically surrounding but not including the Kibbutz of Kvutzat Shiller and the Moshav of Gibton.

Demographics

Between 1914 and 1991, the town's population rose from 955 to 81,000, and its area more than doubled. Parts of Rehovot's suburbs are built on land that belonged to the village of Zarnuqa before 1948, population 2,620, including 240 Jews in Gibton. In 1995, there were 337,800 people living in the greater Rehovot area. , the ethnic makeup of the city was 99.8% Jewish. There were 49,600 males and 52,300 females, of whom 31.6% were 19 years of age or younger, 16.1% between the ages of 20 and 29, 18.2% between 30 and 44, 18.2% from 45 to 59, 3.5% from 60 to 64, and 12.3% 65 years of age or older. The population growth rate was 1.8%.

In Rehovot, there are three significant Jewish ethnic minorities: Russian Jews, Yemenite Jews, and Ethiopian Jews, concentrated largely in the Kiryat Moshe and Oshiot areas. There is a growing community of religious anglo speaking people who primarily live in Northern Rehovot around the Weizmann Institute of Science.

According to the 2019 census, the population of Rehovot was counted to be 143,904, of which 143,536 people, comprising 99.7% of the city's population were classified as "Jews and Others", and 368 people, comprising 0.3% as "Arab".

Education and culture 
The city is home to the Weizmann Institute of Science, the Faculty of Agriculture of the Hebrew University of Jerusalem, and the Peres Academic Center College. There are also a number of smaller colleges in Rehovot that provide specialized and technical training. Kaplan Medical Center acts as an ancillary teaching hospital for the Medical School of the Hebrew University of Jerusalem.

The Minkov Orchard Museum was established in Rehovot with the assistance of the Swiss descendants of Zalma Minkov, whose husband planted the city's first citrus grove.

Economy
, there were 41,323 salaried workers and 2,683 self-employed. The mean monthly wage for a salaried worker was ILS 6,732, a real change of −5.2% over the course of the previous year. Salaried males had a mean monthly wage of ILS 8,786 (a real change of −4.8%) versus ILS 4,791 for females (a real change of −5.3%). The mean income for the self-employed was 6,806. There were 1,082 people receiving unemployment benefits and 6,627 people receiving an income guarantee. In 2013, Rehovot had the highest average net monthly income among households in Israel, at NIS 16,800.

Rehovot is home to numerous industrial plants, and has an industrial park in the western part of the city. Among them are the Tnuva dairy plant, the Yafora-Tavori beverage factory, and the Feldman ice cream factory.

The Tamar Science Park adjoins the older Kiryat Weizmann industrial park. Although the entire extended science park is largely conceived as an area of Rehovot, the Kiryat Weizmann part is actually under the municipal boundaries of neighbouring Ness Ziona. Tamar Science Park is home to branches of leading hi-tech and bio-tech companies.

Sports
Rehovot has had three clubs representing it the top division of Israeli football: Maccabi Rehovot between 1949 and 1956, Maccabi Sha'arayim between 1963 and 1969 and again in 1985, and Hapoel Marmorek in the 1972–73 season. It also has club Bnei Yeechalal which plays at Liga Bet South B.

Today Maccabi Sha'arayim is the highest-ranked club, playing in Liga Leumit, the second level. Marmorek play in Liga Alef, the third level; Maccabi Rehovot play in Liga Gimel, the fifth and lowest division.

During the 1980s, some local swimmers excelled, thanks to the local Weissgal Center Water Park.

List of Rehovot men football clubs playing at state level and above:

Transportation

Public transportation

Rehovot railway station is a suburban commuter railway station serving the city. A historic station that was abandoned since 1948, it was reopened in 1990 with a suburban service to Tel Aviv. It proved to be a major success, since most residents of Rehovot work in Tel Aviv. Following this success, extensive reconstruction work began in 2000, which included the construction of two new passenger terminals, a pedestrian tunnel under the railway, a bus terminal and two large parking lots. The station is situated on the Tel Aviv suburban line (Binyamina/Netanya – Tel Aviv – Rehovot/Ashkelon Suburban Service). All trains in this service stop at Rehovot, and some trains terminate at the station. This line connects the city to Tel Aviv via Lod.

The city is going to be served by 5 Metro Stations along one of the Southern Branches of Line M1, as part of the under construction Tel Aviv Metro Project. This line will connect the city to Tel Aviv via Holon.

The city is served internally and is also connected to other cities in the region, by bus routes operated by Egged Bus Company.

Roads

Rehovot is located between Trunk North-South Highway 40 and Highway 42. Highway 40 connects the city to Kiryat Gat and Beersheva in the South, while Highway 42 connects it to Ashdod. Highway 40 connects the city to Lod-Ramla to the North, also providing connection to Ben Gurion Airport, and bypassing Metro Tel Aviv along the eastern edge, whereas Highway 42 connects the city to Rishon LeZion and the urban centre of Metro Tel Aviv.

Rehovot also has access to the East-West Motorway 431, connecting the city to Modi'in as well as to Jerusalem on the East.

Route 412 (Weizmann Street) is a regional road that goes through the city centre in a Northwest-Southeast Direction, and connects it to neighbouring Ness Ziona.

Mayors 
 1950–1955: 
 1955–1968: 
 1968–1969: 
 1969–1978: Shmuel Rechtman
 1978–1989: 
 1989–1993: 
 1993–1998: 
 1998–2009: 
 2009-present: Rahamim Malul

Twin towns and sister cities

Rehovot is twinned with:

 Albuquerque, United States
 Bistrița, Romania
 Grenoble, France
 Heidelberg, Germany
 Paraná, Argentina
 Rochester, United States
 Valjevo, Serbia

Gallery

Notable people

Nili Abramski, professional long-distance runner
Dan Almagor, playwright
Aki Avni, actor, born in Rehovot
Shawn Dawson (born 1993), Israeli basketball player
Aryeh Frimer, Bar-Ilan University chemist and rabbi
Shlomo Glickstein, professional tennis player, born in Rehovot
Oscar Gloukh, professional football player
Gidi Gov, singer
Michal Hein (born 1968), Olympic windsurfer
Tzipi Hotovely, Member of Knesset for Likud
Eres Holz, composer
Aharon Isser, aeronautical engineer
Roi Kahat, professional footballer
Ephraim Katzir, biophysicist and fourth President of The State of Israel
Olga Kirsch, South African and Israeli poet
Yannets Levi, writer
Nir Levine, professional footballer, director of football youth team on Maccabi Tel Aviv
Shlomit Malka, model
Rahamim Malul, Mayor of Rehovot
Arnon Milchan, Hollywood film producer
Matan Naor, professional basketball player
Talia Rahimi, author
Shmuel Rechtman, Mayor of Rehovot from 1970–1979, born in Rehovot
Sergy Richter (born 1989), Olympic sport shooter and world junior record holder
Danny Robas, singer
Zdenka Samish, Czech-Israel food technology researcher, director of the Department of Food Technology at the Agricultural Research Station (Volcani Center)
Yossi Sarid (1940–2015), politician and news commentator
Eliezer Sherbatov (born 1991), Canadian-Israeli ice hockey player
Asaf Sirkis (born 1969), jazz drummer, composer and educator
Haim Steinbach (born 1944), artist
David Tal, four-time member of Knesset and member of the Kadima party
Israel Tal, an Israel Defense Forces general, designer of Israel's Merkava tank
Benjamin Elazari Volcani, microbiologist
Amir Weintraub, professional tennis player
Chaim Weizmann, first President of the State of Israel
Raz Yirmiya (born 1956), behavioral neuroscientist
S. Yizhar (1916–2006), writer
Ada Yonath, crystallographer at the Weizmann Institute of Science and first Israeli woman Nobel Prize winner

See also
Kaplan Medical Center

References

External links

City council website 
Rehovot at the Jewish Virtual Library
English language guide to Rehovot

 
1890s establishments in Ottoman Syria
Cities in Central District (Israel)
Cities in Israel
Jewish villages in the Ottoman Empire
Populated places established in 1890
Tegart forts
Yemeni-Jewish culture in Israel